Montgomery Pass is a mountain pass on U.S. Route 6 in Mineral County, Nevada.  The pass is near the Nevada/California border in Inyo National Forest.

The populated place of Mount Montgomery is located east of the pass.  Mount Montgomery was also known as Mt. Gomery and Summit.  Mt. Gomery was a station on the Carson and Colorado Railway.  In 1940, Montgomery had a service station, a store and a bar.

Nearby towns are Bishop and Bridgeport, California and Tonopah, Nevada.  The nearest city is Carson City, Nevada, about 180 miles to the north.

There was a small casino near Montgomery Pass, but it burned down sometime before 2011.

References

Populated places in Nevada